Bingo! is the sixteenth studio album by the Steve Miller Band. The album was released on June 15, 2010, by Roadrunner Records and Loud & Proud.

The album is the first studio release by the band since 1993's Wide River. It was recorded alongside a second album which was released 10 months later. The album is dedicated in memory of Norton Buffalo, who died on October 30, 2009. The first single, "Hey Yeah", was available to stream online in April 2010 and available to purchase on May 18, 2010.

Background and production
The album was recorded, beginning in 2008, at Skywalker Studios, the studio owned by filmmaker George Lucas and was produced by Miller and Andy Johns.

The album features cover versions of songs by artists such as B.B. King, Lowell Fulson, Jimmy Reed, and Jimmie Vaughan.

Miller said of the album, "This is a party record, man. It's about getting up and getting ready to dance. It's like the fraternity party gigs I used to play in college. I went through and picked all my favorite tunes that I really, really loved. I wanted to make this record forever; it started off as just kind of a goof, and then it got real serious."

Track listing

Personnel
 Steve Miller – lead guitar, vocals
 Norton Buffalo – harmonica, vocals
 Kenny Lee Lewis – rhythm guitar, vocals
 Joseph Wooten – Hammond B-3, piano, keyboards, vocals
 Gordy Knudtson – drums
 Billy Peterson – bass guitar, vocals
 Sonny Charles – vocals

Additional personnel
 Joe Satriani – solos with Steve Miller on "Rock Me Baby" and "Sweet Soul Vibe"
 Michael Carabello – congas, percussion on "All Your Love (I Miss Loving)"
 Adrian Areas – timbales, percussion on "All Your Love (I Miss Loving)"

References

2010 albums
Steve Miller Band albums
Albums with cover art by Storm Thorgerson
Covers albums
Albums produced by Andy Johns
Roadrunner Records albums